Eric John Holmyard (1891–1959) was an English science teacher at Clifton College, and historian of science and technology.

Scholar
Holmyard studied at Sidney Sussex College, Cambridge and was a member of the Royal Asiatic Society. His scholarly work included rectification of accounts of the history of alchemy, particularly in relation with Islamic science. He translated texts from Arabic and Latin, and wrote extensively on Geber. He was responsible with D. C. Mandeville for the re-attribution of the alchemical text De Mineralibus to an origin in Avicenna. Holmyard served as the founding editor of the scientific review and history of science journal Endeavour.

Textbooks
As a textbook author, he pioneered an approach to science teaching that included historical material. "His historicized science books were an enormous and long-term commercial success, with Elementary Chemistry (1925) alone selling half-a-million copies by 1960."

Teacher
He taught both Nevill Mott and Charles Coulson at Clifton, but his personal influence on them as scientists was low (in Coulson's case, even negative). Holmyard also published best seller, A Higher School Inorganic Chemistry, along with W.G. Palmer.

Historical works
Kitab al-‘Ilm al-maktasab fi zira‘at adh-dhahab: Book of knowledge acquired concerning the cultivation of gold by Abu 'l-Qasim Muhammad ibn Ahmad al-‘Iraqi (1923) translator
Chemistry to the Time of Dalton (1925)
Avicenna De congelatione et conglutinatione lapidum (1927) translator with D. C. Mandeville
The Works of Geber. (1928) with Richard Russell (1678 translator)
Ordinall of Alchemy by Thomas Norton (1929) facsimile, editor
The Great Chemists (1929)
Makers of Chemistry (1931)
Ancestors of An Industry: The story of British scientific achievement (1950)
British Scientists (1951)
Alchemy (1957)
A History of Technology (1954-8) five volumes, with Charles Singer

Notes

References
Entry in the Oxford Dictionary of National Biography

External links
 

1891 births
1959 deaths
Historians of science